East Rudham railway station is a former station in East Rudham, Norfolk. It opened in 1880 and closed in 1959. It was on the Midland and Great Northern Joint Railway between South Lynn and Melton Constable. Initially known as Rudham railway station, it changed its name to East Rudham after two years.

References

Disused railway stations in Norfolk
Former Midland and Great Northern Joint Railway stations
Railway stations in Great Britain opened in 1880
Railway stations in Great Britain closed in 1959